Mathieu Joseph Bonaventure Orfila (Catalan: Mateu Josep Bonaventura Orfila i Rotger) (24 April 1787 – 12 March 1853) was a Spanish toxicologist and chemist, the founder of the science of toxicology.

Role in forensic toxicology 

If there is reason to believe that a murder or attempted murder may have been committed using poison, a forensic toxicologist is often brought in to examine pieces of evidence such as corpses and food items for poison content. In Orfila's time the primary type of poison in use was arsenic, but there were no reliable ways of testing for its presence. Orfila created new techniques and refined existing techniques in his first treatise, Traité des poisons, greatly enhancing their accuracy.

In 1840, Marie Lafarge was tried for the murder of her husband. Although she had had access to arsenic, and arsenic had been found in the victim's food, none could be found in the corpse. Orfila was asked by the court to investigate. He discovered that the test used, the Marsh test, had been performed incorrectly, and that there was in fact arsenic in the body; LaFarge was subsequently found guilty.

References

General

External links 
 Forensic Toxicology, how it solves cases and the major cases it solved
 Bibliothèque Interuniversitaire de Médecine de Paris: Books, biography and studies on Orfila
 

1787 births
1853 deaths
People from Mahón
19th-century French chemists
19th-century Spanish chemists
Chevaliers of the Légion d'honneur
Burials at Montparnasse Cemetery